Benjamin Darbelet (born 13 November 1980 in Dijon) is a French judoka. He earned a silver medal in the 2008 Beijing Olympics in the -66 kg category. Darbelet has recently been competing in the -73 kg weight category. Some of Darbelet's favourite techniques include te guruma, ouchi gari, harai goshi, osoto gari and uchi mata.

External links
 
 Videos of Benjamin Darbelet (judovision.org)
 

1980 births
Living people
French male judoka
Judoka at the 2004 Summer Olympics
Judoka at the 2008 Summer Olympics
Olympic judoka of France
Olympic silver medalists for France
Olympic medalists in judo
Medalists at the 2008 Summer Olympics
Sportspeople from Dijon
Mediterranean Games gold medalists for France
Mediterranean Games medalists in judo
Competitors at the 2001 Mediterranean Games
20th-century French people
21st-century French people